Vaymuzhsky is a rural locality (a settlement) in Yemetskoye Rural Settlement of Kholmogorsky District, Arkhangelsk Oblast, Russia. The population was 67 as of 2010.

Geography 
Vaymuzhsky is located on the Vaymuga River, 143 km southwest of Kholmogory (the district's administrative centre) by road. Oseryodok is the nearest rural locality.

References 

Rural localities in Kholmogorsky District